Santhankadu is a village in the Pattukkottai taluk of Thanjavur district, Tamil Nadu, India.

Demographics 

As per the 2001 census, Santhankadu had a total population of 2003 with 985 males and 1018 females. The sex ratio was 1034. The literacy rate was 73.75.

References 

 

Villages in Thanjavur district